General elections were held in Canton 10 on 2 October 2022 as part of the Bosnian general elections. Voters decided the 25 members of the Assembly of Canton 10.

References 

Canton 10
2022 in Bosnia and Herzegovina
Elections in Bosnia and Herzegovina